The La Mesa Watershed Reservation is a protected area that preserves the only major watershed in Metro Manila, Philippines. Also known as the Novaliches Watershed, it contains the last remaining rainforest of its size in Metro Manila surrounding the La Mesa Dam and Reservoir, the primary source of potable drinking water for 12 million residents in the Manila metropolitan area. The area is under the joint administration, supervision and control of the Department of Environment and Natural Resources and the Metropolitan Waterworks and Sewerage System. It was established in 2007 through Proclamation No. 1336 issued by President Gloria Arroyo.

Geography

It is situated on a flat-topped hill or mesa at the foot of the southern Sierra Madre mountain range west of the Marikina Valley.

It centers on the  La Mesa Dam and Reservoir in Novaliches, an artificial lake which was created in 1929 as part of Manila's Ipo–Novaliches–San Juan water system under the American colonial government. It also contains the  ecological park known as the La Mesa Eco Park. This park located at the southern edges of the watershed in East Fairview is administered by the Quezon City Parks Development and Administration Department and was opened in 2003.

The Tullahan River which passes through Malabon and Navotas starts from the La Mesa Watershed Reservation. It flows until Manila Bay.

Tourism
In 2015, it was reported that 300 thousand people visit the La Mesa Watershed Reservation annually according to park officials. The protected area also has  of nature trails.

Biodiversity

The La Mesa Watershed comprises a variety of ecosystems that is home to many indigenous and endemic species of flora and fauna. Several portions of the La Mesa reservoir are shallow with exposed mudflats, swampforest, reed and other swamp vegetation. Its forest serves as an important breeding area for a variety of wildlife species and birds such as the  little heron, black-crowned night heron, osprey, Japanese sparrowhawk, plain bush-hen, common moorhen, Eurasian coot, Philippine coucal, Philippine nightjar, island swiftlet, spotted wood kingfisher, common kingfisher, white-collared kingfisher, Philippine pygmy woodpecker,  barn swallow, pied triller, ashy minivet, Philippine bulbul, black-naped oriole,  Oriental magpie robin, Arctic warbler, grey-streaked flycatcher, pied fantail, yellow-bellied whistler, grey wagtail, brown shrike, olive-backed sunbird, and lowland white-eye.

The most common tree species found in the reservation are Malay beechwood, earleaf acacia, acacia mangium, narra, mahogany, teak, ipil-ipil, alibangbang and bangkal.

Threats

Threats to the watershed's biodiversity come from land conversion and deforestation from illegal harvesting of forest products. In 2014, the La Mesa park ranger recorded a total of 25 informal settler families living within the reservation who engage in slash-and-burn cultivation or kaingin. A portion of the watershed was also reportedly sold as housing for employees of the Metropolitan Waterworks and Sewerage System which was flagged by the Commission on Audit. Former Environment Secretary Gina Lopez cancelled the environmental compliance certificate for the sale in December 2016.

The Manila Seedling Bank conducted a five-year reforestation program at the watershed from 1978 to 1983. In a 2013 vulnerability assessment by scientist Cristino Tiburan, the La Mesa Watershed Reservation was found to be prone to erosion and landslide.

See also
 Angat Watershed Forest Reserve

References

Birdwatching sites in the Philippines
Geography of Metro Manila
Geography of Rizal
Tourist attractions in Metro Manila
Protected areas of the Sierra Madre (Philippines)
Protected areas established in 2007
2007 establishments in the Philippines